Geoff Holloway is an Australian sociologist, author, poet, conservationist and political activist.

He is a sociologist, as well as activist within the United Tasmania Group in its earlier iteration, and later.

He was one of the individuals present at the meeting that adopted the change of name, while retaining the same focuses, of the South West Tasmania Action Committee to the Tasmanian Wilderness Society in 1976.

He is also author of works about conservation and environment groups in Tasmania.

As UTG secretary from 2018 up until 2020, he also has expressed views that reflect upon earlier environmental issues, such as the Lake Pedder issue with the Mount wellington Cable Car, ecotourism, other articles in The UTG Journal.

Selected works

References

Australian conservationists
Tasmanian Wilderness Society
Living people
1948 births
United Tasmania Group